Jonathan Yamil Alexis Ivanoff (born 14 May 1989) is an Argentine professional footballer who plays as a goalkeeper.

Career
Ivanoff began in the youth of Juventud Cooperativista Quitilipi and Centenario de Venado Tuerto, before joining Sarmiento in 2003. He was a senior for five years from 2008, notably making five appearances in Primera B Metropolitana as they won the league title in 2011–12. June 2013 saw Ivanoff join Independiente. Twenty-four matches followed for him in Torneo Argentino B, in a campaign which the club ended with promotion. He featured forty times across the following two seasons, prior to moving across the division in January 2016 after agreeing terms with Sportivo Las Parejas.

His debut came in February versus Libertad. In August 2017, Ivanoff joined fellow third tier team Chaco For Ever; after a failed medical stopped him signing for Sportivo Desamparados. He didn't appear for the club in 2017–18. At the conclusion of the aforementioned season, Ivanoff departed to join Deportivo Riestra. Like with Chaco For Ever, the goalkeeper didn't participate in a competitive match in 2018–19; though was on the substitutes bench three times. In September 2019, Ivanoff revealed he had joined Juventud Unida de 25 de Mayo of Liga Veinticinqueña.

Career statistics
.

Honours
Sarmiento
Primera B Metropolitana: 2011–12

References

External links

1989 births
Living people
Sportspeople from Chaco Province
Argentine footballers
Association football goalkeepers
Primera B Metropolitana players
Torneo Argentino B players
Torneo Federal A players
Club Atlético Sarmiento footballers
Sportivo Las Parejas footballers
Chaco For Ever footballers
Deportivo Riestra players